Peng Li from the Texas A&M University, College Station, TX, USA was named a fellow of the Institute of Electrical and Electronics Engineers in 2016 for contributions to the analysis and modeling of integrated circuits and systems.

References

Fellow Members of the IEEE
Living people
Year of birth missing (living people)
Place of birth missing (living people)
American electrical engineers